The 1980 Campeonato Brasileiro Série A, (officially the VI Copa Brasil) was the 24th edition of the Campeonato Brasileiro Série A.

Teams and locations

The teams were selected by record on previous state championship.

1 Entered directly on second phase.

First phase

Group A

Group B

Group C

Group D

Second phase

Group E

Group F

Group G

Group H

Group I

Group J

Group K

Group L

Third phase

Group M

Group N

Group O

Group P

Semifinals

First leg

Second leg

Finals

First leg

Second leg

Final standings

References
 1980 Campeonato Brasileiro Série A at RSSSF

1980
1
Brazil
B